Tobias Churton (born 1960) is a British scholar of Rosicrucianism, Freemasonry, Gnosticism, and other esoteric movements. He has a Master's degree in Theology from Brasenose College, Oxford. He is a lecturer at Exeter University, and the author of Gnostic Philosophy, The Magus of Freemasonry, and Freemasonry and other works on esotericism.

Churton has made several television programmes, including Gnostics, a four-part drama-documentary series made for Channel 4 (UK) by Border TV (together with an accompanying book) which was broadcast in 1987 and repeated in 1990. Churton's studies include critique of heresiologists' perceptions on the role of women in these "unorthodox" Christian movements.

He has also written about John T. Desaguliers, and Rosicrucianism.

Churton's biography of Aleister Crowley was released in 2011. Subsequently, he has published four more biographical volumes on Crowley - The Beast in Berlin,  Aleister Crowley in America, Aleister Crowley in India, and Aleister Crowley in England: The Return of the Great Beast, the last biography being due for release on 7 December 2021.

References

External links
The official website of Tobias Churton

Living people
Academics of the University of Exeter
1960 births
Western esotericism scholars